Might makes right or Might is right is an aphorism on the origin of morality, with both descriptive and prescriptive senses.

Descriptively, it asserts that a society's view of right and wrong is determined by those in power, with a meaning similar to "History is written by the victors". That is, although all people have their personal ideas of the good, only those strong enough to overcome obstacles and enemies can put their ideas into effect, and spread their own standards to society at large.

"Might makes right" has been described as the credo of totalitarian regimes. Realist scholars of international politics use the phrase to describe the "state of nature" in which power determines the relations among sovereign states.

Prescriptively (or normatively), the phrase is most often used pejoratively, to protest perceived tyranny.

The phrase sometimes has a positive connotation in the context of master morality or social Darwinism, which hold that a society's strongest members should rule and determine its standards of right and wrong, as well as its goals for the greater good.

History 
The idea of "woe to the conquered" is vividly expressed in Homer, in the hawk parable from Hesiod's Works and Days, and in Livy, in which the equivalent Latin phrase "vae victis" is first recorded.

The idea, though not the wording, has been attributed to the History of the Peloponnesian War by the ancient historian Thucydides, who stated that "right, as the world goes, is only in question between equals in power, while the strong do what they can and the weak suffer what they must."

In the first chapter of Plato's Republic, Thrasymachus claims that "justice is nothing else than the interest of the stronger", which Socrates then disputes. Callicles in Gorgias argues similarly that the strong should rule the weak, as a right owed to their superiority.

The first commonly quoted use of "might makes right" in English was in 1846 by the American pacifist and abolitionist Adin Ballou (1803–1890), who wrote, "But now, instead of discussion and argument, brute force rises up to the rescue of discomfited error, and crushes truth and right into the dust. 'Might makes right,' and hoary folly totters on in her mad career escorted by armies and navies."

Abraham Lincoln's Cooper Union campaign address (1860) reverses the phrase: "Let us have faith that right makes might, and in that faith, let us, to the end, dare to do our duty as we understand it". He spoke in defense of neutral engagement with slave-holders, as against violent confrontation.

In a letter to Albert Einstein from 1932, Sigmund Freud also explores the history and validity of "might versus right".

See also 

 Amorality
 Argumentum ad baculum
 Blaise Pascal
 Egoism
 Fortune favors the bold
 Law of the jungle
 Machiavellianism
 Marquis de Sade
 Master morality
 Max Stirner
 Melian Dialogue
 Might is Right
 Moral nihilism
 Natural selection
 Political realism
 Political repression
 Prize of war
 Right of conquest
 Social Darwinism
 Supremacism
 Trial by combat
 Victor's justice
 War trophy
 Who Dares Wins

References

General references 
 Freud, Sigmund (1968). "Why War?", Civilization, War and Death.

External links 

1840s neologisms
Adages
Concepts in ethics
Political terminology
Quotations from military
Slogans